Anne Reid, MBE (born 28 May 1935) is a British stage, film and television actress, known for her roles as Valerie Barlow in the soap opera Coronation Street (1961–1971); Jean in the sitcom dinnerladies (1998–2000); and her role as Celia Dawson in Last Tango in Halifax (2012–2020) for which she was nominated for the British Academy Television Award for Best Actress. She won the London Film Critics' Circle Award for British Actress of the Year and received a nomination for the BAFTA Award for Best Actress in a Leading Role for her performance in the film The Mother (2003).

Early life
Reid was born in Newcastle upon Tyne, the daughter of Colin Norman Reid (1896–1979) and Annie Eliza (née Weetman) (1896–1980). She lived with her parents and three older brothers in Redcar, where she attended John Emmerson Batty primary school and the White House School. From the age of 11 she attended Penrhos College, a boarding school in North Wales, when her father was posted abroad as a foreign correspondent for  The Daily Telegraph: she visited her parents occasionally in India, Tehran and Beirut in the school holidays. Upon leaving school she moved to London to attend the Royal Academy of Dramatic Art. She then became a stage manager and worked in repertory theatre.

Television

Coronation Street
Although she had already appeared in other television programmes including The Benny Hill Show (1957), Hancock's Half Hour (1957) and The Adventures of Robin Hood (1958), Reid's first major acting role was as the character of Valerie Tatlock (later Barlow) on Coronation Street. Her character was very popular with the show's fans; as such, Valerie's marriage to Ken Barlow can be seen as an early example of a soap supercouple.

Valerie was the mother of the twins Susan and Peter. Reid joined the cast, initially for two months, starting in August 1961 and leaving in October. She returned to the programme to marry Ken on 1 August 1962, in a wedding watched by 15.8 million viewers. In 1965, Val and Ken had twins, and Granada Television received numerous congratulation gifts addressed to the couple.

In 1968, Reid played one of her most difficult parts in Coronation Street when Val was held hostage by a rapist. Although Val was not harmed, viewers sent in hate mail to the actor who played the rapist. In November 1970, Reid announced she was leaving Coronation Street. In a 2011 interview with the Radio Times, Reid said she had enough and wanted to do other things:

I was a basket case when I left! I'd already had too much of it. That kind of work suits some people, but it didn't suit me. It was my decision to leave and I was desperate, really desperate, to go. Because I knew I was good at comedy and there was no way that Valerie Barlow was ever going to be funny.

On 27 January 1971, 18.26 million viewers watched as Valerie Barlow was written out of the soap, dying after being electrocuted by a hairdryer with a faulty plug. On 1 and 3 February 1971, 18.92 million people watched the aftermath and the character's funeral.

Later work
Following a break from acting to bring up her son, during which time she made occasional TV appearances for Granada, such as in Crown Court, Reid resumed her career on stage and television in the 1980s. Reid was a regular performer with Victoria Wood, appearing in several of Wood's projects, including As Seen on TV, the series Victoria Wood in 1989,  and Pat and Margaret in 1994.  From 1998 to 2000, Reid played the major role of Jean in the BBC comedy series dinnerladies written by and starring Wood, and has appeared in other television programmes including Boon (1988), Casualty (1992), Heartbeat (1993  “Baby Blues” as Marjorie Doubleday in series 2 and Auntie Alison in 1997  “Affairs of the Heart”in series 7) and Hetty Wainthropp Investigates (1996). She played Alice Conway in the ITV adaptation of Catherine Cookson’s novel The Wingless Bird in 1997. She also made an appearance in the Doctor Who serial The Curse of Fenric which was broadcast in October 1989.

In 2003, Reid had a part in Midsomer Murders in the episode "A Tale of Two Hamlets" as Sarah Proudie and a main part in the comedy drama The Booze Cruise. She also had a major role in the ITV drama series Life Begins, which ran from 2004 to 2006, in which she appeared alongside Caroline Quentin and Frank Finlay. In 2005 she had a supporting role in the BBC's adaptation of Bleak House and in 2006 made a brief appearance in Jane Eyre.

On 31 March 2007, Reid appeared for a second time in the series Doctor Who in the episode "Smith and Jones". In the episode, she played Florence Finnegan: a shape-shifting, blood-sucking alien known as a Plasmavore, who took on the guise of a human. That same year she appeared in the ITV television adaptation of the novel The Bad Mother's Handbook, co-starring alongside Catherine Tate.

In February 2008, Reid appeared as the mother of Monica Gallagher, Joan, who was suffering from Alzheimer's in the Channel 4 drama Shameless. In October 2008, she played the title role in In Love with Barbara on BBC Four, a biographical film of Barbara Cartland.

In 2009, Reid appeared in the television series Agatha Christie's Marple in the episode Nemesis. From 2009 to 2010 she starred as Vera alongside Maureen Lipman as Irene in an ITV3 adaptation of the BBC Radio 4 series Ladies of Letters.

In 2010, she began playing Mrs Thackeray, the cook, in the BBC's short-lived revival series of Upstairs Downstairs, and also appeared in Five Days, New Tricks and Moving On. In 2011 Reid had a major part in Marchlands, a five-part ITV supernatural drama, made a guest appearance in Doc Martin and played a supporting role in The Jury II.

In 2012 Reid began starring as Celia alongside Sir Derek Jacobi as Alan in the BBC romantic comedy-drama series, Last Tango in Halifax. Reid was nominated for the 2013 British Academy Television Award for Best Actress for this role.

In 2013, she appeared in the second series of the BBC drama Prisoners' Wives as Margaret. She also starred with Katherine Kelly in The Last Witch, part of a series of original dramas for Sky Living and appeared in the final Agatha Christie's Poirot mystery, Curtain: Poirot’s Last Case as Daisy Luttrell. The following year, she guest-starred in "Sardines", the first episode of the BBC anthology series Inside No. 9. She also starred alongside Lee Ingleby and Ralf Little in the six-part BBC drama series Our Zoo.

Reid took part in an episode of the BBC genealogy series Who Do You Think You Are? in September 2015.

In 2017, Reid starred alongside Timothy Spall in "The Commuter", an episode of the Channel 4/Amazon Video anthology series Electric Dreams. In 2018 and 2019, she starred alongside Alison Steadman and John Cleese in a new BBC comedy series, Hold the Sunset.

In 2019 Reid co-starred in a six-part BBC drama series, Years and Years, starring Emma Thompson. Reid played the matriarch of the central family, Muriel Deacon. She also began starring as the wealthy Lady Denham in the ITV adaptation of Jane Austen's unfinished novel, Sanditon.

Film
Reid voiced Wendolene Ramsbottom in the Wallace and Gromit film A Close Shave (1995). Her other film appearances include Love and Death on Long Island (1997); The Mother (2003), for which her performance secured her a nomination for the BAFTA Award for Best Actress in a Leading Role in 2004; Hot Fuzz (2007); Cemetery Junction (2010); and Song for Marion (2013).

Additionally, Reid filmed a minor role as a lesbian headmistress in the movie Love Actually (2003), but Reid is not credited in the cast list since all her scenes were ultimately deleted, because they were not central to the main plot. The scenes can, however, be viewed in the deleted scenes on the Love Actually DVD.

Theatre
In 2002 Reid appeared in the premiere of The York Realist at the Royal Court Theatre, which later transferred to the West End.

From September 2005 to January 2006, she appeared on stage in the West End in Epitaph for George Dillon.

In June 2007, Reid played the role of Jack's mother in Stephen Sondheim's Into the Woods, at the Royal Opera House in Covent Garden.

From January to May 2008, Reid appeared in the National Theatre's production of Happy Now?, a new play by Lucinda Coxon.

From March to May 2009, Reid appeared at the Donmar Warehouse in Dimetos, a 1975 play by Athol Fugard.

From September to November 2012, Reid appeared at London's Old Vic, in a production of Ibsen's Hedda Gabler, starring Sheridan Smith.

On 26 January 2015, Reid played Madame Armfeldt in a special concert version of A Little Night Music, at the Palace Theatre, to celebrate 40 years since the musical premiered in the West End.

In July and August 2016, Reid appeared at the Minerva Theatre, Chichester alongside James Bolam in a new play, Fracked! Or: Please Don't Use the F-Word by Alistair Beaton. The play was revived for a national tour in April and May 2017.

From October to December 2017, Reid returned to the West End opposite Eve Best in Oscar Wilde's A Woman of No Importance at the Vaudeville Theatre.

From March to May 2023, Reid will star in the UK premiere of Marjorie Prime by Jordan Harrison, at the Menier Chocolate Factory in London.

Filmography

Awards and nominations

References

External links

1935 births
20th-century English actresses
21st-century English actresses
Actresses from Northumberland
Actresses from London
Alumni of RADA
English film actresses
English musical theatre actresses
English radio actresses
English soap opera actresses
English stage actresses
English television actresses
English voice actresses
Living people
Members of the Order of the British Empire
People educated at Rydal Penrhos
Actresses from Newcastle upon Tyne